Postmortem (released as Obit in the United Kingdom) is a 1998 film directed by Albert Pyun, starring Charlie Sheen, Ivana Miličević and Michael Halsey. It was filmed in Glasgow, Scotland.

Plot
American criminal profiler and author James McGregor (Charlie Sheen), who is trying to escape his past by moving to Scotland, where he receives a fax of a stranger's obituary. The next day he is arrested and charged with the stranger's murder, forcing him to collaborate with the local authorities if he wants to clear himself and stop a serial killer.

Cast
 Charlie Sheen as James McGregor (Charles Sheen)
 Michael Halsey as Inspector Balantine
 Ivana Miličević as Gwen Turner
 Stephen McCole as George Statler
Alan Orr as Young George Statler
 Gary Lewis as Wallace
 Dave Anderson as Captain Moore
 Phil McCall as George Statler Sr.
 Ian Hanmore as Theodore Symes
 Zoë Eeles as Nurse
 Annabel Reid as Girl in Country Store
 Simon Weir as Beverly's Boyfriend
 Ian Cairns as The Undertaker

Production
The film was shot in Glasgow in 1997. At one point during production, Sheen demanded to visit Easterhouse, one of Glasgow's toughest areas at the time, to obtain drugs and asked for a gun to protect himself. It is suggested Sheen agreed to this film in an attempt to try more serious roles.

References

External links

1998 films
1998 crime drama films
American crime drama films
Films directed by Albert Pyun
Films set in Glasgow
Films shot in Glasgow
1990s English-language films
1990s American films